Tamás Horváth (born 4 March 1983) is a Hungarian footballer who plays as a defender for Békéscsaba. He made seven appearances in Nemzeti Bajnokság I, the highest level of football in Hungary, for Rákospalota.

References

1983 births
Living people
People from Békéscsaba
Hungarian footballers
Association football defenders
Újpest FC players
FC Fót footballers
Rákospalotai EAC footballers
Békéscsaba 1912 Előre footballers
Nemzeti Bajnokság I players
Sportspeople from Békés County